María Fernanda Campo Saavedra is the former minister of education of Colombia until August 2014. In 2011 she was appointed Acting Mayor of Bogotá by President Juan Manuel Santos in replacement of Samuel Moreno Rojas, who was stripped of his office following an investigation into the appropriation of city contracts. An industrial engineer, before her nomination she was the President of the Bogotá Chamber of Commerce from 2000 to 2010, the first woman to hold that position, and has also served as Deputy Minister of Foreign Affairs between 1998 and 1999.

References

External links
 

Living people
People from Valle del Cauca Department
Colombian Ministers of National Education
Mayors of Bogotá
Women mayors of places in Colombia
21st-century Colombian women politicians
21st-century Colombian politicians
Women government ministers of Colombia
20th-century Colombian women politicians
20th-century Colombian politicians
Kogod School of Business alumni
Year of birth missing (living people)
Foreign ministers of Colombia
Female foreign ministers